Frank Hamilton Hankins (September 27, 1877 – January 24, 1970) was an American sociologist and anthropologist who was the president of the American Sociological Society in 1938. He wrote the book The Racial Basis of Civilization (1926) which was critical of racial theories such as Aryanism, Gobinism, Celticism, Anglo-Saxonism and Nordicism.

In 1933 he was one of signers of the Humanist Manifesto.

Works 
 Adolphe Quetelet as Statistician (1908)
 The Racial Basis of Civilization: A Critique of the Nordic Doctrine (1926)
 An Introduction to the Study of Society: An Outline of Primary Factors and Fundamental Institutions (1928)
 Reminiscences of Frank Hamilton Hankins (1968)

References

External links 

1877 births
1970 deaths
American sociologists
People from Van Wert County, Ohio
Columbia University alumni
Clark University faculty